Tutti defunti... tranne i morti is a 1977 film directed by Pupi Avati.

Production
Following the release of The House with Laughing Windows, director Pupi Avati became anxious of his reputation as a director, stating that he was being described as the "Polanski of Po Valley'" which he did not like.
 Do this Avati developed his next film Tutti defunti...tranne i morti, which Italian film historian and critic Roberto Curti described as a combination of old dark house gothic, elements of Agatha Christie's Ten Little Indians, and tongue-in-cheek parodies of giallo. The story and screenwriting credits in the film are credited to Pupi Avati, his brother Antonio Avati, Gianni Cavina, and Maurizio Costanzo, Pupi Avati stated that "most ideas were mine" and that the screenwriters "did not follow a real method: we were trying to out do each other on who managed to reach the most absurd territory.

While casting for the film, the role of Buster played by Michele Mirabella was originally planned for Luigi Montefiori. Curti described the film as having a low budget with a small crew. The film was shot in the hills near Bologna and Modena in late 1976.

Release
Tutti defunti...tranne i morti was distributed in Italy by Euro International film on 10 March 1977. The film grossed a total of 279,708,450 Italian lire on its domestic release.

References

Footnotes

Sources

External links
 

Italian parody films
Films directed by Pupi Avati
1970s parody films
1977 comedy films
1977 films
1970s Italian films